The 2002 Oklahoma State Cowboys football team represented the Oklahoma State University in the 2002 NCAA Division I-A football season. The Cowboys' Houston Bowl appearance in 2002 was only the second time in 14 years that OSU made it to a bowl game.

Schedule

Game summaries

Nebraska

Source: USA Today
    
    
    
    
    
    
    

Oklahoma State's first win versus Nebraska since 1961.

Roster

Team players in the NFL
The following players were drafted into professional football following the season.

Cowboys Rashaun Woods (31st overall), Tatum Bell (41st overall), and Antonio Smith (135th overall) would be selected in the 2004 NFL Draft.

Awards and honors
Rashaun Woods, Co-MVP, Houston Bowl
Kevin Williams, Co-MVP, Houston Bowl

References

Oklahoma State
Oklahoma State Cowboys football seasons
Houston Bowl champion seasons
Oklahoma State Cowboys football